Moštanica is a village in central Croatia, in the Town of Petrinja, Sisak-Moslavina County. It is connected by the D30 highway.

Demographics
According to the 2011 census, the village of Moštanica had 93 inhabitants. This represents 34.44% of its pre-war population according to the 1991 census.

References

Populated places in Sisak-Moslavina County